Xima is a town under the administration of Yingjiang County, Yunnan, China. , it has three villages under its administration.

References

Township-level divisions of Dehong Dai and Jingpo Autonomous Prefecture
Yingjiang County